The 1901 New South Wales state election was held on 3 July 1901 for all of the 125 seats in the 19th New South Wales Legislative Assembly and it was conducted in single-member constituencies with a first past the post voting system. The Parliamentary Electorates Act of 1893 had conferred the right to vote on every male British subject over 21 years of age who was resident in New South Wales for a year or more. The 19th parliament of New South Wales was dissolved on 11 June 1901 by the Governor, Lord Beauchamp, on the advice of the Premier, John See.

Federation had seen a re-evaluation of priorities among the main political parties in New South Wales, with the Protectionist Party and the Free Trade Party becoming the Progressive Party and the Liberal Reform Party respectively.

Key dates

Results

{{Australian elections/Title row
| table style = float:right;clear:right;margin-left:1em;
| title        = New South Wales state election, 3 July 1901
| house        = Legislative Assembly
| series       = New South Wales state election
| back         = 1898
| forward      = 1904
| enrolled     = 345,500
| total_votes  = 194,980
| turnout %    = 62.84
| turnout chg  = +2.23
| informal     = 1,534
| informal %   = 0.78
| informal chg = −0.14
}}

|}

Retiring members

Changing seats

Notes

See also
 Candidates of the 1901 New South Wales state election
 Members of the New South Wales Legislative Assembly, 1901–1904

References

1901 New South Wales state election
1901 elections in Australia
1901 New South Wales state election
July 1901 events